Matija Kvasina (born 4 December 1981) is a Croatian racing cyclist, who most recently rode for UCI Continental team . He finished 56th in the road race and 38th in the road time trial at the 2008 Summer Olympics in Beijing. In 2017, Kvasina was given a four-year doping suspension after a positive drugs test at that year's Flèche du Sud.

Career

In 2016, he won the overall title at the Tour of Croatia.

Doping
Kvasina tested positive for an experimental drug known as Molidustat (BAY-85-3934), during two tests taken during the 2017 Flèche du Sud - a race in which he won. Molidustat represents a class of drugs that act on the same physiological pathways and enzyme cascades as those which are activated during altitude training. Oxygen deprivation has the effect of stimulating the body's production of erythropoietin (EPO) - Molidustat imitates this. Kvasina was subsequently kicked out of the 2017 Tour of Austria.

In oxygen poor environments the human body manufactures a protein called hypoxia-inducible factor (HIF), which initiates and drives the processes which allow the body to adapt to those low-oxygen conditions. Typically this involves increasing the concentrations of naturally made EPO, mobilising iron and an increase in the rate of red blood cell production. Under normal oxygen environmental conditions, HIF is kept in check (its actions are inhibited) by an enzyme called prolyl hydroxylase (PH). Moldustat stops PH from blocking HIF, thus, increasing both the concentrations of EPO and red blood cells in the body, imitating altitude training.

Major results

2002
 4th Trofeo Alcide Degasperi
 10th Overall GP Kranj
2003
 6th Overall Jadranska Magistrala
 7th GP Istria 3
 8th Trofeo Alcide Degasperi
2004
 1st  Time trial, National Road Championships
 6th Overall Tour of Slovenia
 7th Overall Tour de l'Avenir
2005
 1st  Road race, National Road Championships
 1st Overall Tour de Serbie
1st Stage 2
 4th Tour de Berne
 6th Giro del Belvedere
 8th Overall Tour de l'Avenir
 8th Poreč Trophy
 10th Overall Tour of Slovenia
2006
 1st  Time trial, National Road Championships
 2nd Overall Vuelta a Cuba
1st Stage 11a (ITT)
 3rd Overall Rhône-Alpes Isère Tour
 4th Overall Tour de Serbie
 4th GP Triberg-Schwarzwald
 5th Overall Tour of Slovenia
 6th Overall Tour de l'Avenir
 9th Overall Regio-Tour
 10th Overall Circuit des Ardennes
2007
 National Road Championships
1st  Time trial
3rd Road race
 1st Stage 2 Course de la Solidarité Olympique
 2nd GP Triberg-Schwarzwald
 3rd Overall Tour de Serbie
 3rd Giro del Belvedere
 6th Overall Tour of Slovenia
 6th Rund um die Hainleite
 10th Sparkassen Giro Bochum
2008
 1st  Time trial, National Road Championships
 1st Overall Tour de Serbie
 2nd Trofeo Zsšdi
 2nd Ljubljana–Zagreb
 8th Overall Tour of Slovenia
 10th Overall Istrian Spring Trophy
2009
 2nd Giro Valli Aretine
 3rd Overall Grand Prix Cycliste de Gemenc
 6th Overall Tour of Slovenia
2010
 4th Trofeo Internazionale Bastianelli
 9th Giro del Veneto
 10th Overall Course de la Solidarité Olympique
2011
 1st Banja Luka–Belgrade II
 1st Central European Tour Miskolc GP
 National Road Championships
2nd Time trial
3rd Road race
 6th Overall Tour of Bulgaria
 6th Trofeo Avis
 8th Overall Tour of Slovenia
2012
 1st Overall Tour of Romania
1st Stage 5
 2nd Overall Sibiu Cycling Tour
 3rd Time trial, National Road Championships
 4th Overall Tour of Szeklerland
1st Mountains classification
1st Stages 3 & 4 (ITT)
 4th Central European Tour Miskolc GP
 5th Overall Tour de Serbie
 8th Overall Istrian Spring Trophy
2013
 1st  Time trial, National Road Championships
 2nd Overall Sibiu Cycling Tour
 3rd Overall Okolo Jižních Čech
1st Stage 3
 4th Raiffeisen Grand Prix
 8th Overall Giro della Regione Friuli Venezia Giulia
 9th Overall Istrian Spring Trophy
1st Mountains classification
 10th Overall Tour of Austria
2014
 1st  Overall Rhône-Alpes Isère Tour
 1st  Mountains classification Circuit des Ardennes
 2nd Trofej Umag
 3rd Road race, National Road Championships
 3rd Overall Okolo Slovenska
 5th Overall Tour de Bretagne
 6th Tour de Berne
2015
 National Road Championships
1st  Time trial
3rd Road race
 3rd Overall Settimana Internazionale di Coppi e Bartali
 9th Overall Rhône-Alpes Isère Tour
 9th Overall Czech Cycling Tour
2016
 1st  Time trial, National Road Championships
 1st  Overall Tour of Croatia
 3rd Overall Tour de Serbie
 8th Overall Tour d'Azerbaïdjan
 9th Poreč Trophy
2017
 National Road Championships
1st  Time trial
2nd Road race
 1st  Overall Flèche du Sud
 7th Overall Rhône-Alpes Isère Tour
1st Mountains classification

References

External links
 

1981 births
Living people
Croatian male cyclists
Cyclists at the 2008 Summer Olympics
Cyclists at the 2016 Summer Olympics
Olympic cyclists of Croatia
People from Nova Gradiška
Sport in Brod-Posavina County